"Not Nineteen Forever" is the fourth single released by indie rock band The Courteeners. Taken from their debut studio album St. Jude, it was released on 31 March 2008 on a CD and two 7" singles. It reached #19 in the UK Singles Chart making it the highest charting Courteeners single to date. 
It was most recently used as Manchester United's record breaking 20th title winning song. The song is featured on Pro Evolution Soccer 2010.

Chart performance

The single was released on 31 March 2008 as both a CD single and as two alternate 7" singles. It managed to enter the UK Singles Chart at a peak of #19, making it the Courteeners' most successful single to date.

Lyrical meaning

The lyrics concern a conversation between a young man and his older girlfriend, who is disappointed by his wild and hedonistic behaviour that night, and she drives him for 'tea and toast'. He flirts with her in the car, but she reminds him he's only young and needs to get his life together. He goes out again and chases another woman, but she disappears before he can make conversation. He muses about how she probably wasn't worth chasing before understanding his girlfriend's words.

Track listing

 CD
 "Not Nineteen Forever" – 4:05
 "Smiths Disco" – 2:47

 7" (1)
 "Not Nineteen Forever"
 "Trying Too Hard To Score"

 7" (2)
 "Not Nineteen Forever"
 "If It Wasn't For Me" (demo)

Certifications

References

External links

2008 singles
The Courteeners songs
2008 songs
Polydor Records singles
Song recordings produced by Stephen Street
Songs written by Liam Fray